Endemol Australia, formerly known as Southern Star Group, Southern Star Productions, Southern Star/Hanna-Barbera Australia and Taft-Hardie Group Pty Ltd, was Australia's largest independent television production and distribution group. On 26 July 2015, the company was merged with Shine Australia to form Endemol Shine Australia.

History 

The company began in 1972 as Hanna-Barbera Pty Ltd (Australia), an Australian division of Hanna-Barbera (which was founded by Kevin Weldon). In 1974, the Hamlyn Group's Australian division managed by Kevin Weldon acquired 50% of Hanna-Barbera Australia and appointed Neil Balnaves as managing director. In 1978, James Hardie Industries acquired the Hamlyn Group, and in 1979, Balnaves was promoted to managing director of the entire Hamlyn Group.

In 1983, James Hardie Industries and Hanna-Barbera corporate parent Taft Broadcasting reorganised the division as Taft-Hardie Group Pty Ltd. In 1984, the company established a division in Los Angeles known as Southern Star Productions, founded and headed by Buzz Potamkin. Programs produced by this division would be animated at Hanna-Barbera's studios in Sydney, and carried the name Southern Star/Hanna-Barbera Australia. It co-owned CIC Video's Australian video unit called CIC-Taft Video and launched a video label, THG Video, in 1984, then renamed to Taft Video in 1987. In 1987, it made a $42 million bid for Communications and Entertainment Limited, but it never realised.

In 1988, Neil Balnaves led an A$11 million management buyout of Taft-Hardie, reorganising the company as Southern Star Group. The home video division was renamed to Southern Star Video in 1989. The Sydney animation facilities were also sold, while the Los Angeles division continued to operate until 1991 when it was sold to Turner Broadcasting System.

In April 2004, the company was acquired by Southern Cross Broadcasting and in 2007 by Fairfax Media.

In January 2009, Endemol acquired Southern Star Factual from Fairfax Media in a transaction worth A$75 million, forming a division known as Endemol Southern Star.

Southern Star Productions's founder Buzz Potamkin died from pancreatic cancer on 22 April 2012.

On 11 December 2013, Southern Star announced it would rebrand as Endemol Australia, completing the rollout by February 2014. The change was brought about by Chief Executive Officer, Janeen Faithfull.

On 15 November 2016, Mark and Carl Fennessy were appointed joint CEOs of Endemol Australia as well as its parent company, Endemol Shine Australia.

Southern Star Group's founder Neil Balnaves died in a boating accident on 21 February 2022.

Programs

Prime-time drama

As Hanna-Barbera Pty Ltd / Taft-Hardie Group Pty Ltd 
 Deadline (1982, TV movie)
 Return to Eden (1983–1986)
 The Last Frontier (1986, TV miniseries)
 Shark's Paradise (1986, TV movie)

As Southern Star 
 Party Tricks
 Offspring
 Return to Eden
 Love My Way
 The Surgeon
 Blue Heelers
 The Secret Life of Us
 Always Greener
 Water Rats
 Marking Time
 Police Rescue
 Murder Call
 Rescue: Special Ops
 Wild Boys
 Rush
 Young Lions
 Blue Murder
 Dangerous
 Out of the Blue
 Fireflies
 Spirited
 Rain Shadow
 The Alice
 Tangle
 Puberty Blues
 Bed of Roses
 Big Sky
 Howzat! Kerry Packer's War
 McLeod's Daughters (2001–2009)
 City Homicide
 Echo Point
 The Beautiful Lie
 Cody
 Which Way Home
 Good Vibrations
 Gallipoli
 Paper Giants: The Birth of Cleo
 Paper Giants: Magazine Wars
 Children of the Dragon
 Beaconsfield
 Power Games: The Packer-Murdoch War
 Police Crop: The Winchester Conspiracy
 On the Beach
 Joh's Jury
 Dripping in Chocolate
 Hard Knox
 Do or Die
 Police State
 The Last Frontier
 Remember Me
 A Difficult Woman

Comedy 
 Bad Cop, Bad Cop
 The Bob Morrison Show
 Dayne's World
 Legally Brown
 You Have Been Watching
 Con's Bewdiful Holiday Videos

 Kids & family 
 As Hanna-Barbera Pty Ltd / Taft-Hardie Group Pty Ltd 
 Famous Classic Tales (1970–1983)
 The Toothbrush Family (1974)
 Taggart's Treasure (1976) (unsold pilot)
 The Flintstones: Little Big League (1978, TV movie)
 Dinky Dog (1978–1981)
 Drak Pack (1980)
 The Kwicky Koala Show  (1981–1982)
 CBS Storybreak (1985–1989) 
 The Berenstain Bears (1985–1987)
 Teen Wolf (1986–1987) 

 As Southern Star 
 A*mazing Around the World in 80 Days Foreign Exchange The Adventures of Sam The Beeps Blue Water High RAGGS Kids Club Band The Sleepover Club Tracey McBean Cake Business! The Missed Christmas Presents The Adventures of Bottle Top Bill and His Best Friend Corky Magic Mountain Snobs Bananas in Pyjamas (co-production with ABC)
 Faireez Ketchup: Cats Who Cook Time Masters Wipeout Marvin: Baby of the Year (TV special)
 Cartoon All-Stars to the Rescue (TV special)
 Fox's Peter Pan & the Pirates (co-production with TMS Entertainment and Fox Children's Productions, distributed by 20th Television)
 Mad Scientist Hi-5 (co-production with Nine Network)
 Elly & Jools Kangaroo Creek Gang Don't Blame The Koalas Pig's Breakfast In Your Dreams Outriders Sea Princesses Y? A gURLs wURLd High Flyers All for Kids Hairy Legs Classic Tales Sumo Mouse Snake Tales Skippy the Bush Kangaroo Arthur! and the Square Knights of the Round Table The Wayne Manifesto Gordon the Garden Gnome Reality, factual & documentary 
 RPA – (1995–2012)
 Ralph TV – (2007)
 Battlefronts – (2008)
 Monster House – (2008)
 Garden Angels – (2009)
 No Leave, No Life – (2009–2012)
 Beauty and the Geek Australia – (2010–2011)
 Drug Lords – (2010)
 Real Prison Breaks – (2010–2011)
 Strictly Speaking – (2010)
 Undercover Boss Australia – (2010–2011)
 Balls of Steel Australia – (2011–2012)
 Big Brother Australia – Network 10 (2001–2008) and Nine Network (2012–2014)
 Don't Tell the Bride – (2012)
 When Love Comes to Town – (2014)
 Mesmerised – (2015)
 Married at First Sight Australia – (2015–present)
 The Hotplate – (2015)

 Animal Emergency Animal Lifeline Animals Did It First At the Zoo Crash Test Mummies & Daddies Elephants Empire Forensic Investigators Last Chance Surgery Next Wave Saving Africa's Witch Children Secret China Secret Nature Wild China Wild Orphans Meerkat Manor Films 
 beDevil (1993)
 No Worries (1994)
 The Sum of Us (1994)
 Rough Diamonds (1994)
 The Well (1997)
 Serenades'' (2001)

See also 

 List of film production companies
 List of television production companies

References

External links 
 

Television production companies of Australia
Australian animation studios
Endemol
Banijay